= Civil servant (Azerbaijan) =

State employee of Azerbaijan

Everyone who works as a civil servant (state employee) in Azerbaijan must be a citizen of the country according its law on civil service. The law states that civil servants are paid from the state budget.

== Duties ==
The civil servant should fulfill the following duties:

- to carry out laws and other standard legitimate acts adopted by public authorities;
- to execute orders issued by managers;
- to obey the service regulations determined by public authorities;
- to avoid any activity that can cause difficulties in the work of other employees as well as actions that can be harmful to the reputation of the public authority he/she works in;
- timely review the appeals of citizens, organizations and enterprises and resolve them impartially;
- to keep private information of state and other privileged insights secured by law counting in case of civil service termination;
- to keep private a data uncovered amid execution of official obligations and related to the private life, honour and respect of the citizens, not request such data excepting the cases expected by law.
- to follow the ethical behavior rules.

== Rights ==
According to the law of the Republic, civil servants have the following rights:

- to require and receive from the public authorities and open organizations the data and materials required to carry out their duties;
- to require composed recognizable proof of his/her official obligations and arrangement of conditions for its satisfaction from the state authorities entitled to designate and expel a gracious worker from position;
- to receive state wages;
- to claim the benefit advancement or increment of state compensation considering professional development and satisfaction of official duties;
- to be locked in logical and imaginative movement, to be included in educational and other paid movement with a consent of the head of state body he/she serves in;
- to obtain a benefit from stores, securities, rent;
- at the primary ask, to familiarize with all documents of his/her individual record, references and other reports being recorded in that, as well as to request incorporation of his/her explanations to the private file;
- to request conducting of official examination in arrange to negate a data damaging his/her respect and dignity;
- to secure his/her legitimate rights and interface in important bodies and court;
- to connect exchange unions.
